Lázaro Fonseca Costa Oliveira (born 27 August 1967), known simply as Lázaro in his playing days, is an Angolan retired footballer who played as a central midfielder, and the current head coach for Macau national football team.

Playing career
Lázaro spent his entire career in Portugal. He started professionally at G.D. Estoril Praia in the second division, scoring a combined eight goals in his first two seasons, the latter finishing in promotion to the Primeira Liga.

In the top level, however, Lázaro was only a backup player during three years, his best input being 17 matches in the 1991–92 campaign – 11 starts – as the Lisbon team finished in tenth position. He subsequently competed in divisions three and two, with Louletano D.C. and F.C. Penafiel respectively.

Aged 30, Lázaro returned to the top flight with C.F. Estrela da Amadora, also in the Portuguese capital. He would be regularly played during five of his seven years with the club, retiring in December 2003 with competition totals of 148 games and seven goals (plus 211 appearances and 23 goals in the second tier).

International goals
Scores and results list Angola's goal tally first.

Coaching career
Lázaro took up coaching immediately after retiring, spending four years as an assistant at Estrela always in the top tier. Early into the 2008–09 season he replaced countryman Lito Vidigal as head coach, leading the team into safety only to suffer relegation due to financial irregularities.

In summer 2009, Lázaro joined another former club, Penafiel in the second division. He was sacked midway through his second year, joining another side in that level, Portimonense SC, on 18 January 2012. He was dismissed on 21 April with the team in seventh place with two games remaining of the campaign, after a run of poor results made qualifying for the play-offs difficult.

Lázaro became manager of Atlético Clube de Portugal, struggling in the second level, on 9 January 2015. He quit the Lisbon-based side on 28 March, with them second from last.

On 22 July 2016, Lázaro returned to the Algarve, taking over at S.C. Farense of the third tier. He was sacked the following 3 April, after a 2–2 draw with neighbours Louletano D.C. left the team in fifth, six points away from leaders C.D. Fátima.

References

External links

1967 births
Living people
Angolan footballers
Association football midfielders
Primeira Liga players
Liga Portugal 2 players
Segunda Divisão players
G.D. Estoril Praia players
Louletano D.C. players
F.C. Penafiel players
C.F. Estrela da Amadora players
Angola international footballers
1998 African Cup of Nations players
Angolan expatriate footballers
Expatriate footballers in Portugal
Angolan expatriate sportspeople in Portugal
Angolan football managers
Primeira Liga managers
Liga Portugal 2 managers
C.F. Estrela da Amadora managers
F.C. Penafiel managers
Portimonense S.C. managers
S.C. Farense managers
Angolan expatriate football managers
Expatriate football managers in Portugal